Naru (also Romanized as Nārū; also known as Nārak and Tārak) is a village in Aliabad Rural District, Khafr District, Jahrom County, Fars Province, Iran. At the 2006 census, its population was 208, in 36 families.

References 

Populated places in  Jahrom County